= Famigo (entertainment company) =

Digital content company

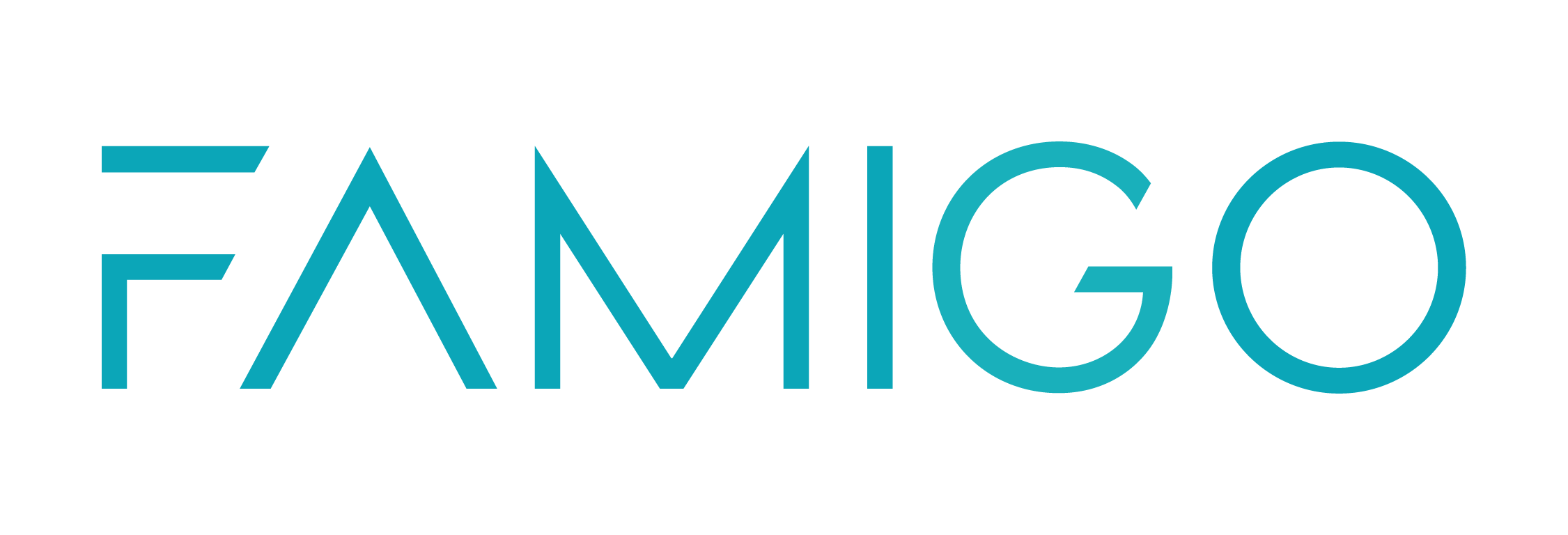
- "Make more doing what you love"
- Company type: Technology
- Industry: Digital Content Marketplace
- Founded: 2021
- Headquarters: USA (Phoenix & Miami)
- Website: famigo.com

Famigo (stylized FAMIGO) is a digital content marketplace for content creators. Based in Phoenix and Miami, the platform is accessible via website and application. Famigo is a portmanteau of "family" and "amigo".

== History ==
In 2019, FAMIGO was co-founded by Maria Luna, Hector Rodriguez, and Tanmay Shahane primarily, as a web application marketed as a monetization platform for independent artists, musicians, creators, and influencers.

From 2019 to 2020, the company launched a beta web-based subscription marketplace that allowed the creators to engage fans with monthly subscriptions of exclusive digital content. After testing with a small group of content creators, it launched as FAMIGO on September 21, 2021 (during Latin Music Week) and is currently available in 55 countries.
